In jurisprudence, reparation is replenishment of a previously inflicted loss by the criminal to the victim. Monetary restitution is a common form of reparation.

Background
In the Basic Principles and Guidelines on the Right to a Remedy and Reparation for Victims of Gross Violations of International Human Rights Law and Serious Violations of International Humanitarian Law, reparation include the following forms: restitution, compensation, rehabilitation, satisfaction and guarantees of non-repetition, whereby
 Satisfaction should include, where applicable, any or all of the following: .. 
 (e) Public apology, including acknowledgement of the facts and acceptance of responsibility;
 (g) Commemorations and tributes to the victims;
 (h) Inclusion of an accurate account of the violations that occurred in international human rights law and international humanitarian law training and in educational material at all levels.
 23. Guarantees of non-repetition should include
 (e) Providing, on a priority and continued basis, human rights and international humanitarian law education to all sectors of society and training for law enforcement officials as well as military and security forces;

History

The principle of reparation dates back to the lex talionis of Hebrew Scripture. Anglo-Saxon courts in England before the Norman conquest also contained this principle. Under the English legal system judges must consider making a compensation order as part of the sentence for a crime. Section 130 of the Powers of Criminal Courts (Sentencing) Act 2000 requires the courts to explain their reasoning if they do not issue a compensation order.

See also 

English unjust enrichment law
Holocaust reparations
Legal remedy
Reparations Agreement between Israel and West Germany
Reparations for slavery
Reparations for slavery in the United States
Reparations (transitional justice)
Reparations (website)
Restitution
Slavery reparations scam
War reparations

References

Reparations
Criminal law
Justice